Gerald Brashear was a Seattle jazz performer from the 1940s to the mid-1970s.

Ernestine Anderson said, "Brashear had taught himself to play the style of Dizzy's Cuban drummer, Chano Pozo. Buddy Catlett says Brashear 'played like a Cuban', he was that good."

"The Cecil Young Quartet album, released on King in 1951 as a 10 inch LP under the title Concert of Cool Jazz was the first local record since the Maxin Trio's to make an impact outside Seattle ... The Norman record showcased Brashear and so impressed San Francisco jazz critic Ralph Gleason that he encouraged local disc jockeys to play the cut, writing that Brashear's scat solo on 'Who Parked the Car/.' was the best scat solo ever recorded. Gerald's solo is so incontestably in a class by itself, Eddie Jefferson and Jon Hendricks notwithstanding ... Brashear weaves curlicue Lestorian solos with an appealing dry, woody tone, fluid, fleet phrasing, and spitfire tonguing."

References 

American jazz drummers
American jazz saxophonists
American male saxophonists
Musicians from Seattle
Living people
Place of birth missing (living people)
Year of birth missing (living people)
21st-century American saxophonists
21st-century American male musicians
American male jazz musicians